Gusty Back (15 October 1927 – 22 November 2010) was a Luxembourgian footballer. He played in nine matches for the Luxembourg national football team from 1951 to 1955. He was also part of Luxembourg's squad for the football tournament at the 1952 Summer Olympics, but he did not play in any matches.

References

External links
 

1927 births
2010 deaths
Luxembourgian footballers
Luxembourg international footballers
Place of birth missing
Association football forwards
Stade Dudelange players